"Symfonin" is a song written by Elisabeth Lord and Tommy Gunnarsson, and performed by Loa Falkman at Melodifestivalen 1990. Lyrical, it deals with using music and singing to unite the peoples of the Earth.

The single, which was released the same year, peaked at 17th position at the Swedish singles chart. The song also charted at Svensktoppen for 12 weeks between 25 March-10 June 1990, peaking at second position.

Chart trajectories

References

1990 singles
Anti-war songs
Melodifestivalen songs of 1990
Swedish-language songs
1990 songs
Songs about music